This is a list of the bird species recorded in New Caledonia. The avifauna of New Caledonia include a total of 223 species, of which 28 are endemic, and 13 have been introduced by humans. 

This list's taxonomic treatment (designation and sequence of orders, families and species) and nomenclature (common and scientific names) follow the conventions of The Clements Checklist of Birds of the World, 2022 edition. The family accounts at the beginning of each heading reflect this taxonomy, as do the species counts found in each family account. Introduced and accidental species are included in the total counts for New Caledonia.

The following tags have been used to highlight several categories. The commonly occurring native species do not fall into any of these categories.

(A) Accidental - a species that rarely or accidentally occurs in New Caledonia
(E) Endemic - a species endemic to New Caledonia
(I) Introduced - a species introduced to New Caledonia as a consequence, direct or indirect, of human actions
(Ex) Extirpated - a species that no longer occurs in New Caledonia although populations exist elsewhere
(Ext) Extinct - a species formerly endemic or native to New Caledonia, that is now extinct

Ducks, geese, and waterfowl
Order: AnseriformesFamily: Anatidae

Anatidae includes the ducks and most duck-like waterfowl, such as geese and swans. These birds are adapted to an aquatic existence with webbed feet, flattened bills, and feathers that are excellent at shedding water due to an oily coating.

Wandering whistling-duck, Dendrocygna arcuata (A)
Canada goose, Branta canadensis (A)
Australian shoveler, Spatula rhynchotis (A)
Pacific black duck, Anas superciliosa
Mallard, Anas platyrhynchos (I)
Gray teal, Anas gracilis (A)
Auckland Islands teal, Anas aucklandica (Ex)
Brown teal, Anas chlorotis (A)
Hardhead, Aythya australis

Megapodes
Order: Galliformes   Family: Megapodiidae

Megapodes or scrubfowl are grouse-like birds that live on the forest floor. They have stocky proportions and large feet('Megapode' means 'large foot' in Latin). They usually lay their eggs in a mound of warm compost or in a geothermally active area to incubate them, from which the chicks hatch fully developed and independent. Three extinct species are known from New Caledonia-one also known from Tonga, and the other two, one from the Isle of Pines and the other from the Loyalty Islands, are both undescribed.

Pile-builder megapode, Megapodius molistructor (Ext)
Loyalty Islands megapode, Megapodius species (Ext)
Île des Pins megapode, Megapodius species (Ext)

Sylviornithids
Order: Pangalliformes Family: Sylviornithidae

The Sylviornithidae are an extinct group of stem-galliform birds that includes Sylviornis and Megavitiornis. They are sometimes erroneously called giant scrubfowl or giant megapodes.

New Caledonian giant scrubfowl, Sylviornis neocaledoniae (Ext)

Pheasants, grouse, and allies
Order: GalliformesFamily: Phasianidae

The Phasianidae are a family of terrestrial birds. In general, they are plump (although they vary in size) and have broad, relatively short wings.

Indian peafowl, Pavo cristatus (I)
Red junglefowl, Gallus gallus (I)
Ring-necked pheasant, Phasianus colchicus (I)
Wild turkey, Meleagris gallopavo (I)

Grebes

Order: PodicipediformesFamily: Podicipedidae

Grebes are small to medium-large freshwater diving birds. They have lobed toes and are excellent swimmers and divers. However, they have their feet placed far back on the body, making them quite ungainly on land.

Australasian grebe, Tachybaptus novaehollandiae

Pigeons and doves

Order: ColumbiformesFamily: Columbidae

Pigeons and doves are stout-bodied birds with short necks and short slender bills with a fleshy cere.

Rock pigeon, Columba livia (I)
Metallic pigeon, Columba vitiensis
Spotted dove, Streptopelia chinensis (I)
Pacific emerald dove, Chalcophaps longirostris
Zebra dove, Geopelia striata (I)
Red-bellied fruit-dove, Ptilinopus greyi
Cloven-feathered dove, Drepanoptila holosericea (E)
Pacific imperial-pigeon, Ducula pacifica
New Caledonian imperial-pigeon, Ducula goliath (E)
Kanaka pigeon, Caloenas canacorum (Ext)
New Caledonian ground dove, Pampusana longitarsus (Ext)

Cuckoos

Order: CuculiformesFamily: Cuculidae

The family Cuculidae includes cuckoos, roadrunners and anis. These birds are of variable size with slender bodies, long tails and strong legs. The Old World cuckoos are brood parasites.

Long-tailed koel, Urodynamis taitensis
Channel-billed cuckoo, Scythrops novaehollandiae (A)
Shining bronze-cuckoo, Chrysococcyx lucidus
Fan-tailed cuckoo, Cacomantis flabelliformis

Nightjars and allies
Order: CaprimulgiformesFamily: Caprimulgidae

Nightjars are medium-sized nocturnal birds that usually nest on the ground. They have long wings, short legs and very short bills. Most have small feet, of little use for walking, and long pointed wings. Their soft plumage is camouflaged to resemble bark or leaves.

New Caledonian nightjar, Eurostopodus exul
White-throated nightjar, Eurostopodus mystacalis

Owlet-nightjars
Order: CaprimulgiformesFamily: Aegothelidae

The owlet-nightjars are small nocturnal birds related to the nightjars and frogmouths. They are insectivores which hunt mostly in the air. Their soft plumage is a mixture of browns and paler shades.

New Caledonian owlet-nightjar, Aegotheles savesi (E)

Swifts

Order: CaprimulgiformesFamily: Apodidae

Swifts are small birds which spend the majority of their lives flying. These birds have very short legs and never settle voluntarily on the ground, perching instead only on vertical surfaces. Many swifts have long swept-back wings which resemble a crescent or boomerang.

White-throated needletail, Hirundapus caudacutus (A)
Glossy swiftlet, Collocalia esculenta
Satin swiftlet, Collocalia uropygialis
White-rumped swiftlet, Aerodramus spodiopygius
Australian swiftlet, Aerodramus terraereginae
Uniform swiftlet, Aerodramus vanikorensis (A)

Rails, gallinules, and coots
Order: GruiformesFamily: Rallidae

Rallidae is a large family of small to medium-sized birds which includes the rails, crakes, coots and gallinules. Typically they inhabit dense vegetation in damp environments near lakes, swamps or rivers. In general they are shy and secretive birds, making them difficult to observe. Most species have strong legs and long toes which are well adapted to soft uneven surfaces. They tend to have short, rounded wings and to be weak fliers.

New Caledonian rail, Gallirallus lafresnayanus (E)-possibly extinct
Buff-banded rail, Gallirallus philippensis
Dusky moorhen, Gallinula tenebrosa
New Caledonian gallinule, Porphyrio kukwiedei (E) (Ext)
Australasian swamphen, Porphyrio melanotus
White-browed crake, Poliolimnas cinereus (A)
Baillon's crake, Zapornia pusilla (A)
Spotless crake, Zapornia tabuensis

Thick-knees

Order: CharadriiformesFamily: Burhinidae

The thick-knees are a group of largely tropical waders in the family Burhinidae. They are found worldwide within the tropical zone, with some species also breeding in temperate Europe and Australia. They are medium to large waders with strong black or yellow-black bills, large yellow eyes and cryptic plumage. Despite being classed as waders, most species have a preference for arid or semi-arid habitats.

Beach thick-knee, Esacus magnirostris

Oystercatchers
Order: CharadriiformesFamily: Haematopodidae

The oystercatchers are large and noisy plover-like birds, with strong bills used for smashing or prising open molluscs.

South Island oystercatcher, Haematopus finschi (A)

Plovers and lapwings
Order: CharadriiformesFamily: Charadriidae

The family Charadriidae includes the plovers, dotterels and lapwings. They are small to medium-sized birds with compact bodies, short, thick necks and long, usually pointed, wings. They are found in open country worldwide, mostly in habitats near water.

Black-bellied plover, Pluvialis squatarola
Pacific golden-plover, Pluvialis fulva
Masked lapwing, Vanellus miles
Lesser sand-plover, Charadrius mongolus
Greater sand-plover, Charadrius leschenaultii (A)
Double-banded plover, Charadrius bicinctus (A)
Semipalmated plover, Charadrius semipalmatus (A)
Oriental plover, Charadrius veredus (A)
Hooded plover, Thinornis cucullatus

Sandpipers and allies
Order: CharadriiformesFamily: Scolopacidae

Scolopacidae is a large diverse family of small to medium-sized shorebirds including the sandpipers, curlews, godwits, shanks, tattlers, woodcocks, snipes, dowitchers and phalaropes. The majority of these species eat small invertebrates picked out of the mud or soil. Variation in length of legs and bills enables multiple species to feed in the same habitat, particularly on the coast, without direct competition for food.

Whimbrel, Numenius phaeopus
Little curlew, Numenius minutus (A)
Far Eastern curlew, Numenius madagascariensis (A)
Bar-tailed godwit, Limosa lapponica
Black-tailed godwit, Limosa limosa (A)
Ruddy turnstone, Arenaria interpres
Great knot, Calidris tenuirostris (A)
Red knot, Calidris canutus (A)
Sharp-tailed sandpiper, Calidris acuminata
Curlew sandpiper, Calidris ferruginea (A)
Red-necked stint, Calidris ruficollis
Sanderling, Calidris alba
Latham's snipe, Gallinago hardwickii (A)
New Caledonian snipe, Coenocorypha neocaledonica (Ext)
Terek sandpiper, Xenus cinereus
Common sandpiper, Actitis hypoleucos
Gray-tailed tattler, Tringa brevipes
Wandering tattler, Tringa incana
Common greenshank, Tringa nebularia
Marsh sandpiper, Tringa stagnatilis (A)

Buttonquail
Order: CharadriiformesFamily: Turnicidae

The buttonquail are small, drab, running birds which resemble the true quails. The female is the brighter of the sexes and initiates courtship. The male incubates the eggs and tends the young.

New Caledonian buttonquail, Turnix novaecaledoniae (E)(Ex)

Pratincoles and coursers
Order: CharadriiformesFamily: Glareolidae

Glareolidae is a family of wading birds comprising the pratincoles, which have short legs, long pointed wings and long forked tails, and the coursers, which have long legs, short wings and long, pointed bills which curve downwards.

Australian pratincole, Stiltia isabella (A)

Skuas and jaegers
Order: CharadriiformesFamily: Stercorariidae

The family Stercorariidae are, in general, medium to large birds, typically with grey or brown plumage, often with white markings on the wings. They nest on the ground in temperate and arctic regions and are long-distance migrants.

South polar skua, Stercorarius maccormicki (A)
Brown skua, Stercorarius antarcticus
Pomarine jaeger, Stercorarius pomarinus (A)
Parasitic jaeger, Stercorarius parasiticus (A)
Long-tailed jaeger, Stercorarius longicaudus

Gulls, terns, and skimmers

Order: CharadriiformesFamily: Laridae

Laridae is a family of medium to large seabirds, the gulls, terns, and skimmers. Gulls are typically grey or white, often with black markings on the head or wings. They have stout, longish bills and webbed feet. Terns are a group of generally medium to large seabirds typically with grey or white plumage, often with black markings on the head. Most terns hunt fish by diving but some pick insects off the surface of fresh water. Terns are generally long-lived birds, with several species known to live in excess of 30 years.

Silver gull, Chroicocephalus novaehollandiae
Brown noddy, Anous stolidus
Black noddy, Anous minutus
Gray noddy, Anous albivitta
White tern, Gygis alba
Sooty tern, Onychoprion fuscatus
Bridled tern, Onychoprion anaethetus
Little tern, Sternula albifrons
Australian fairy tern, Sternula nereis
White-winged tern, Chlidonias leucopterus (A)
Whiskered tern, Chlidonias hybrida
Roseate tern, Sterna dougallii
Black-naped tern, Sterna sumatrana
Great crested tern, Thalasseus bergii
Lesser crested tern, Thalasseus bengalensis (A)

Kagus

Order: EurypygiformesFamily: Rhynochetidae

The kagu or cagou is a long-legged grey bird found only in the dense mountain forests of New Caledonia. It is almost flightless. It builds a ground nest of sticks and lays a single egg. It is vulnerable to rats and cats which are introduced species on the island, hence it is now threatened with extinction. The remote habitat and rarity of this species mean that little is known of its habits. It formerly had a relative, the lowland kagu, which was about 15% larger. This died out after the first human contact with the island.

Kagu, Rhynochetos jubatus (E)
Lowland kagu, Rhynochetos orarius (Ext)

Tropicbirds
Order: PhaethontiformesFamily: Phaethontidae

Tropicbirds are slender white birds of tropical oceans, with exceptionally long central tail feathers. Their heads and long wings have black markings.

White-tailed tropicbird, Phaethon lepturus
Red-tailed tropicbird, Phaethon rubricauda

Albatrosses
Order: ProcellariiformesFamily: Diomedeidae

The albatrosses are among the largest of flying birds, and the great albatrosses from the genus Diomedea have the largest wingspans of any extant birds.

Buller's albatross, Thalassarche bulleri (A)
Black-browed albatross, Thalassarche melanophris (A)
Light-mantled albatross, Phoebetria palpebrata (A)
Royal albatross, Diomedea epomophora (A)
Wandering albatross, Diomedea exulans (A)

Southern storm-petrels
Order: ProcellariiformesFamily: Oceanitidae

The southern storm-petrels are relatives of the petrels and are the smallest seabirds. They feed on planktonic crustaceans and small fish picked from the surface, typically while hovering. The flight is fluttering and sometimes bat-like.

Wilson's storm-petrel, Oceanites oceanicus (A)
White-faced storm-petrel, Pelagodroma marina (A)
White-bellied storm-petrel, Fregetta grallaria (A)
Black-bellied storm-petrel, Fregetta tropica (A)
New Caledonian storm-petrel, Fregetta lineata
Polynesian storm-petrel, Nesofregetta fuliginosa

Northern storm-petrels
Order: ProcellariiformesFamily: Hydrobatidae

The northern storm-petrels are relatives of the petrels and are the smallest seabirds. They feed on planktonic crustaceans and small fish picked from the surface, typically while hovering. The flight is fluttering and sometimes bat-like.

Band-rumped storm-petrel, Hydrobates castro (A)

Shearwaters and petrels
Order: ProcellariiformesFamily: Procellariidae

The procellariids are the main group of medium-sized "true petrels", characterised by united nostrils with medium septum and a long outer functional primary.

Southern giant-petrel, Macronectes giganteus (A)
Northern giant-petrel, Macronectes halli (A)
Cape petrel, Daption capense (A)
Kermadec petrel, Pterodroma neglecta (A)
Herald petrel, Pterodroma heraldica
Providence petrel, Pterodroma solandri (A)
Mottled petrel, Pterodroma inexpectata
White-necked petrel, Pterodroma cervicalis (A)
Bonin petrel, Pterodroma hypoleuca
Black-winged petrel, Pterodroma nigripennis
Cook's petrel, Pterodroma cookii (A)
Gould's petrel, Pterodroma leucoptera
Collared petrel, Pterodroma brevipes
Fairy prion, Pachyptila turtur (A)
Antarctic prion, Pachyptila desolata (A)
Bulwer's petrel, Bulweria bulwerii (A)
Tahiti petrel, Pseudobulweria rostrata
Gray petrel, Procellaria cinerea (A)
Parkinson's petrel, Procellaria parkinsoni (A)
Streaked shearwater, Calonectris leucomelas (A)
Flesh-footed shearwater, Ardenna carneipes (A)
Wedge-tailed shearwater, Ardenna pacificus
Buller's shearwater, Ardenna bulleri (A)
Sooty shearwater, Ardenna griseus
Short-tailed shearwater, Ardenna tenuirostris
Fluttering shearwater, Puffinus gavia
Little shearwater, Puffinus assimilis
Tropical shearwater, Puffinus bailloni

Frigatebirds
Order: SuliformesFamily: Fregatidae

Frigatebirds are large seabirds usually found over tropical oceans. They are large, black-and-white or completely black, with long wings and deeply forked tails. The males have coloured inflatable throat pouches. They do not swim or walk and cannot take off from a flat surface. Having the largest wingspan-to-body-weight ratio of any bird, they are essentially aerial, able to stay aloft for more than a week.

Lesser frigatebird, Fregata ariel
Great frigatebird, Fregata minor

Boobies and gannets
Order: SuliformesFamily: Sulidae

The sulids comprise the gannets and boobies. Both groups are medium to large coastal seabirds that plunge-dive for fish.

Masked booby, Sula dactylatra
Brown booby, Sula leucogaster
Red-footed booby, Sula sula
Australasian gannet, Morus serrator

Cormorants and shags
Order: SuliformesFamily: Phalacrocoracidae

Phalacrocoracidae is a family of medium to large coastal, fish-eating seabirds that includes cormorants and shags. Plumage colouration varies, with the majority having mainly dark plumage, some species being black-and-white and a few being colourful.

Little pied cormorant, Microcarbo melanoleucos
Great cormorant, Phalacrocorax carbo
Little black cormorant, Phalacrocorax sulcirostris

Pelicans
Order: PelecaniformesFamily: Pelecanidae

Pelicans are large water birds with a distinctive pouch under their beak. As with other members of the order Pelecaniformes, they have webbed feet with four toes.

Australian pelican, Pelecanus conspicillatus (A)

Herons, egrets, and bitterns
Order: PelecaniformesFamily: Ardeidae

The family Ardeidae contains the bitterns, herons and egrets. Herons and egrets are medium to large wading birds with long necks and legs. Bitterns tend to be shorter necked and more wary. Members of Ardeidae fly with their necks retracted, unlike other long-necked birds such as storks, ibises and spoonbills.

Australasian bittern, Botaurus poiciloptilus (Ex)
Black-backed bittern, Ixobrychus dubius
Great egret, Ardea alba (A)
Intermediate egret, Ardea intermedia
White-faced heron, Egretta novaehollandiae
Little egret, Egretta garzetta
Pacific reef-heron, Egretta sacra
Pied heron, Egretta picata (A)
Cattle egret, Bubulcus ibis (A)
Striated heron, Butorides striata (A)
Nankeen night-heron, Nycticorax caledonicus

Ibises and spoonbills
Order: PelecaniformesFamily: Threskiornithidae

Threskiornithidae is a family of large terrestrial and wading birds which includes the ibises and spoonbills. They have long, broad wings with 11 primary and about 20 secondary feathers. They are strong fliers and despite their size and weight, very capable soarers.

Glossy ibis, Plegadis falcinellus
Royal spoonbill, Platalea regia (A)

Osprey
Order: AccipitriformesFamily: Pandionidae

The family Pandionidae contains only one species, the osprey. The osprey is a medium-large raptor which is a specialist fish-eater with a worldwide distribution.

Osprey, Pandion haliaetus

Hawks, eagles, and kites
Order: AccipitriformesFamily: Accipitridae

Accipitridae is a family of birds of prey, which includes hawks, eagles, kites, harriers and Old World vultures. These birds have powerful hooked beaks for tearing flesh from their prey, strong legs, powerful talons and keen eyesight.

Swamp harrier, Circus approximans
Brown goshawk, Accipiter fasciatus
New Caledonia goshawk, Accipiter haplochrous (E)
Black kite, Milvus migrans
Whistling kite, Haliastur sphenurus
White-bellied sea-eagle, Haliaeetus leucogaster (A)

Barn-owls
Order: StrigiformesFamily: Tytonidae

Barn-owls are medium to large owls with large heads and characteristic heart-shaped faces. They have long strong legs with powerful talons.

Australasian grass-owl, Tyto longimembris
Barn owl, Tyto alba
New Caledonian barn owl, Tyto letocarti (Ext)

Owls
Order: StrigiformesFamily: Strigidae

The typical owls are small to large solitary nocturnal birds of prey. They have large forward-facing eyes and ears, a hawk-like beak and a conspicuous circle of feathers around each eye called a facial disk.

New Caledonian boobook, Ninox cf. novaeseelandiae (Ext)

Hornbills
Order: BucerotiformesFamily: Bucerotidae

An extinct hornbill from the genus Rhyticeros has been found on Lifou Island in the Loyalty Islands. The fossil is about 30,000 years old. The species has not been described yet and it is unclear whether it was found only on the Loyalty Islands or on them and New Caledonia proper.

Lifou hornbill, Rhyticeros species

Kingfishers
Order: CoraciiformesFamily: Alcedinidae

Kingfishers are medium-sized birds with large heads, long, pointed bills, short legs and stubby tails.

Sacred kingfisher, Todirhamphus sanctus

Bee-eaters

Order: CoraciiformesFamily: Meropidae

The bee-eaters are a group of near passerine birds in the family Meropidae. Most species are found in Africa but others occur in southern Europe, Madagascar, Australia and New Guinea. They are characterised by richly coloured plumage, slender bodies and usually elongated central tail feathers. All are colourful and have long downturned bills and pointed wings, which give them a swallow-like appearance when seen from afar.

Rainbow bee-eater, Merops ornatus

Falcons and caracaras
Order: FalconiformesFamily: Falconidae

Falconidae is a family of diurnal birds of prey. They differ from hawks, eagles and kites in that they kill with their beaks instead of their talons.

Nankeen kestrel, Falco cenchroides (A)
Peregrine falcon, Falco peregrinus

Cockatoos
Order: PsittaciformesFamily: Cacatuidae

Cockatoos are large parrots that are usually white and often have colorful crests. They are distributed over Australia, Papua New Guinea and parts of Indonesia, the Solomon Islands and the Philippines. A fossil of a cockatoo has recently been discovered in New Caledonia, but is yet to be described.

New Caledonian cockatoo, Cacatua sp. (Ext)

Old World parrots

Order: PsittaciformesFamily: Psittaculidae

Characteristic features of parrots include a strong curved bill, an upright stance, strong legs, and clawed zygodactyl feet. Many parrots are vividly colored, and some are multi-colored. Old World parrots are found from Africa east across south and southeast Asia and Oceania to Australia and New Zealand.

Horned parakeet, Eunymphicus cornutus (E)
Ouvea parakeet, Eunymphicus uvaeensis (E)
New Caledonian parakeet, Cyanoramphus saissetti (E)
New Caledonian lorikeet, Vini diadema (E)-probably extinct
Coconut lorikeet, Trichoglossus haematodus
Rainbow lorikeet, Trichoglossus moluccanus

Honeyeaters

Order: PasseriformesFamily: Meliphagidae

The honeyeaters are a large and diverse family of small to medium-sized birds most common in Australia and New Guinea. They are nectar feeders and closely resemble other nectar-feeding passerines.

New Caledonian myzomela, Myzomela caledonica (E)
Cardinal myzomela, Myzomela cardinalis
Barred honeyeater, Gliciphila undulata (E)
Dark-brown honeyeater, Lichmera incana
Crow honeyeater, Gymnomyza aubryana (E)
New Caledonian friarbird, Philemon diemenensis (E)

Thornbills and allies
Order: PasseriformesFamily: Acanthizidae

Thornbills are small passerine birds, similar in habits to the tits.

Fan-tailed gerygone, Gerygone flavolateralis

Cuckooshrikes
Order: PasseriformesFamily: Campephagidae

The cuckooshrikes are small to medium-sized passerine birds. They are predominantly greyish with white and black, although some species are brightly coloured.

Black-faced cuckooshrike, Coracina novaehollandiae (A)
South Melanesian cuckooshrike, Coracina caledonica
Polynesian triller, Lalage maculosa (A)
Long-tailed triller, Lalage leucopyga
White-rumped triller, Lalage leucopygialis
New Caledonian cuckooshrike, Analisoma analis (E)

Whistlers and allies

Order: PasseriformesFamily: Pachycephalidae

The family Pachycephalidae includes the whistlers, shrikethrushes, and some of the pitohuis.

Vanuatu whistler, Pachycephala chlorura
New Caledonian whistler, Pachycephala caledonica (E)
Golden whistler, Pachycephala pectoralis
Rufous whistler, Pachycephala rufiventris

Woodswallows, bellmagpies, and allies

Order: PasseriformesFamily: Artamidae

The woodswallows are soft-plumaged, somber-coloured passerine birds. They are smooth, agile flyers with moderately large, semi-triangular wings.

White-breasted woodswallow, Artamus leucorynchus
Dusky woodswallow, Artamus cyanopterus (A)

Fantails
Order: PasseriformesFamily: Rhipiduridae

The fantails are small insectivorous birds which are specialist aerial feeders.

Streaked fantail, Rhipidura verreauxi
Gray fantail, Rhipidura fuliginosa

Monarch flycatchers
Order: PasseriformesFamily: Monarchidae

The monarch flycatchers are small to medium-sized insectivorous passerines which hunt by flycatching.

Southern shrikebill, Clytorhynchus pachycephaloides
Melanesian flycatcher, Myiagra caledonica

Crows, jays, and magpies
Order: PasseriformesFamily: Corvidae

The family Corvidae includes crows, ravens, jays, choughs, magpies, treepies, nutcrackers and ground jays. Corvids are above average in size among the Passeriformes, and some of the larger species show high levels of intelligence.

New Caledonian crow, Corvus moneduloides (E)

Australasian robins
Order: PasseriformesFamily: Petroicidae

Most species of Petroicidae have a stocky build with a large rounded head, a short straight bill and rounded wingtips. They occupy a wide range of wooded habitats, from subalpine to tropical rainforest, and mangrove swamp to semi-arid scrubland. All are primarily insectivores, although a few supplement their diet with seeds.

Yellow-bellied robin, Eopsaltria flaviventris (E)

Grassbirds and allies
Order: PasseriformesFamily: Locustellidae

The family Locustellidae is a group of small insectivorous passerine birds. Most are of generally undistinguished appearance, but many have distinctive songs.

New Caledonian thicketbird, Megalurulus mariei (E)

Swallows
Order: PasseriformesFamily: Hirundinidae

The family Hirundinidae is adapted to aerial feeding. They have a slender streamlined body, long pointed wings and a short bill with a wide gape. The feet are adapted to perching rather than walking, and the front toes are partially joined at the base.

Pacific swallow, Hirundo tahitica
Welcome swallow, Hirundo neoxena
Tree martin, Petrochelidon nigricans (A)

Bulbuls
Order: PasseriformesFamily: Pycnonotidae

Bulbuls are medium-sized songbirds. Some are colourful with yellow, red or orange vents, cheeks, throats or supercilia, but most are drab, with uniform olive-brown to black plumage. Some species have distinct crests.

Red-vented bulbul, Pycnonotus cafer (I)

White-eyes, yuhinas, and allies

Order: PasseriformesFamily: Zosteropidae

The white-eyes are small and mostly undistinguished, their plumage above being generally some dull colour like greenish-olive, but some species have a white or bright yellow throat, breast or lower parts, and several have buff flanks. As their name suggests, many species have a white ring around each eye.

Large Lifou white-eye, Zosterops inornatus (E)
Green-backed white-eye, Zosterops xanthochrous (E)
Small Lifou white-eye, Zosterops minutus (E)
Silvereye, Zosterops lateralis

Starlings
Order: PasseriformesFamily: Sturnidae

Starlings are small to medium-sized passerine birds. Their flight is strong and direct and they are very gregarious. Their preferred habitat is fairly open country. They eat insects and fruit. Plumage is typically dark with a metallic sheen.

Striated starling, Aplonis striata (E)
European starling, Sturnus vulgaris (A)
Common myna, Acridotheres tristis (I)

Thrushes and allies
Order: PasseriformesFamily: Turdidae

The thrushes are a group of passerine birds that occur mainly in the Old World. They are plump, soft plumaged, small to medium-sized insectivores or sometimes omnivores, often feeding on the ground. Many have attractive songs.

Island thrush, Turdus poliocephalus

Waxbills and allies

Order: PasseriformesFamily: Estrildidae

The estrildid finches are small passerine birds of the Old World tropics and Australasia. They are gregarious and often colonial seed eaters with short thick but pointed bills. They are all similar in structure and habits, but have wide variation in plumage colours and patterns.

Common waxbill, Estrilda astrild (I)
Blue-faced parrotfinch, Erythrura trichroa (A)
Red-throated parrotfinch, Erythrura psittacea (E)
Chestnut-breasted munia, Lonchura castaneothorax (I)
Java sparrow, Padda oryzivora (Ex)

Old World sparrows
Order: PasseriformesFamily: Passeridae

Old World sparrows are small passerine birds. In general, sparrows tend to be small, plump, brown or grey birds with short tails and short powerful beaks. Sparrows are seed eaters, but they also consume small insects.

House sparrow, Passer domesticus (I)

See also
List of birds
Lists of birds by region

References

New Caledonia
 
New Caledonia-related lists